The men's discus throw competition of the athletics events at the 2011 Pan American Games took place on the 24 of October at the Telmex Athletics Stadium. The defending Pan American Games champion is Michael Robertson of the United States.

Records
Prior to this competition, the existing world and Pan American Games records were as follows:

Qualification
Each National Olympic Committee (NOC) was able to enter up to two entrants providing they had met the minimum standard (53.00 meters) in the qualifying period (January 1, 2010 to September 14, 2011).

Results
14 athletes from 11 countries competed, with the final round taking place at 17:35 on October 24, 2011. Results were as follows:

 DNS = Did not start

References

Athletics at the 2011 Pan American Games
201